The Crime of the Century is a British television drama which aired 1956 to 1957 on the BBC. It was created by English solicitor and crime fiction writer Michael Gilbert. A serial consisting of six episodes, the drama centered around the lawyer Mr. Brakewell (portrayed by Edward Chapman), his secretary Clare Pinnock (Gene Anderson), and his associates Charlton Bradbury (William Lucas), Major Trump (Ballard Berkeley), and M. Bernard (Patrick Westwood). Only a single episode survives in the archives.

References

External links

1956 British television series debuts
1957 British television series endings
Lost BBC episodes
English-language television shows
1950s British drama television series
Black-and-white British television shows
BBC television dramas
1950s British crime television series